SLAM family member 7 is a protein that in humans is encoded by the SLAMF7 gene.

The surface antigen CD319 (SLAMF7) is a robust marker of normal plasma cells and malignant plasma cells in multiple myeloma. In contrast to CD138 (the traditional plasma cell marker), CD319/SLAMF7 is much more stable and allows robust isolation of malignant plasma cells from delayed or even cryopreserved samples.

Elotuzumab is an antibody that targets this protein.

References

Further reading